René Fonck (17 February 1923 – 26 February 2018) was a Luxembourgian sprint canoeist who competed in the late 1940s. He was born in Luxembourg City. At the 1948 Summer Olympics in London, he finished 15th in the K-2 10000 m event while being eliminated in the heats of the K-2 1000 m event. In 2008 he was promoted to the rank of Chevalier in the Order of Merit of the Grand Duchy of Luxembourg.

References

1923 births
2018 deaths
Canoeists at the 1948 Summer Olympics
Sportspeople from Luxembourg City
Luxembourgian male canoeists
Olympic canoeists of Luxembourg
Knights of the Order of Merit of the Grand Duchy of Luxembourg